Jason Sherman (born November 10, 1976) is an American entrepreneur, author, and videographer. He is a co-founder and CEO of mobile video platform Instamour; and director of the historical documentary The King's Highway.

Early life
As a child in the early 1980s Sherman went to the Institute for the Achievement of Human Potential. On March 1, 1987, he played violin on stage at a concert with Liza Minnelli at the Academy of Music. He also appeared on a TV show called Whitney & Company in 1979 where he did calculations as a young student on live TV.

Education
Sherman graduated from Delaware Valley University in 1998 with a Bachelor of Science degree in Computer Information Systems Management.

Career
In 2003, Sherman started a technology consulting company, Go To Consulting LLC after working in the IT departments of different Fortune 500 companies for five years after graduating university. In 2007, he started his career as a videographer while continuing to form new companies. In 2009, Sherman created Instamour, a video dating mobile platform.

Sherman is also known for writing, producing, directing, and editing "The Bucks County Massacre". It won the Audience Choice Mid-Atlantic film award at the 2011 New Hope Film Festival. Shortly after, it was picked up by Maxim Media International and Brain Damage Films to be released worldwide.

In 2014, Instamour was able to raise funding above $150,000 and won the Techie 100 award. Instamour was one of the 6 companies selected out of thousands to attend the 2014 StartFast Venture Accelerator in New York. The accelerator was founded by TriNet founder Martin Babinec. Instamour won a registered trademark after battling with Instagram over the name.

Sherman wrote all of his methodologies, strategies and tactics in a startup guide called “Strap on your Boots”. Shortly after publishing the book and introducing the book to various universities, the University of Pennsylvania’s Wharton School hired Sherman to create a course called "Startup Essentials" based on the book and then teach it as the instructor from December 2016 to May 2017. As soon as the course was completed, Sherman published a more detailed and extensive course on Udemy.

In 2015, Sherman came across the oldest road in America, known as the King's Highway (Charleston to Boston) which was not far from his residence. Sherman interviewed over fifty historians, experts, teachers, professors and politicians. He then wrote, directed, produced, and edited "The King’s Highway". The film won the Best Feature Documentary award at the 2016 First Glance Film festival. It was added to the Amazon Video library and independent streaming platform Indieflix. The film aired on WHYY-TV during the months of June and July 2017. Shortly after, Sherman received a contract from Los Angeles-based film distributor Indie Rights for worldwide distribution. On June 12, 2018 PA House Resolution 974 was passed by the House of Representatives, naming August 20 King's Highway Day to honor the achievements of the film.

Sherman has also been writing for Technically Media since April 2014 as a journalist. He also published a story called Future Visions in the summer 2014 edition of 2600: The Hacker Quarterly and has appeared as a regular speaker on the Fox Broadcasting Company Futurist TV Show: Xploration Earth 2050, which is an Emmy winning show and part of Xploration Station.

References

American business executives
1976 births
Living people